Aurelian-Antonio Tecuceanu (13 January 1972 – 5 January 2010), also known as Toni, was a Romanian comedy actor. He was a member of Cronica Cârcotaşilor, a popular sitcom at Prima TV.

On 5 January 2010 he died at Matei Balş Hospital in Bucharest, due to complications from swine flu, at age 37. His death created a panic in Romania and after his death the rate of vaccinations increased. He was buried at Ghencea Cemetery.

Career
Tecuceanu played well-known characters such as Adrian Năstase, Corneliu Vadim Tudor, Cristian Ţânţăreanu or Gigi Becali. He took part in peace-keeping missions under the command of United Nations. He also performed on the theatre scene, and played in movies and TV broadcastings. In 2006, at Gala Tânărului Actor, Tecuceanu was awarded the best actor prize for Lomeier in the spectacle Noapte arabă, directed by Theodorei Herghelegiu, performance at Teatrul Foarte Mic from Bucharest.

Film
 2009  – Amintiri din Epoca de Aur

See also
 Cronica Cârcotaşilor
 2009 flu pandemic in Romania

References

External links

 

1972 births
2010 deaths
Male actors from Bucharest
Romanian male stage actors
Deaths from influenza
Infectious disease deaths in Romania
Romanian male film actors
Burials at Ghencea Cemetery